The Stambadri Urban Development Authority is an urban planning agency in Khammam district of the Indian state of Telangana. It was approved by the state government and has its headquarters at Khammam.

References 

Khammam district
Urban development authorities of Telangana